In public transport, Route 10 may refer to:

Route 10 (MTA Maryland), a bus route in Baltimore, Maryland and its suburbs
London Buses route 10
Line 10 (Madrid Metro)
SEPTA Route 10, a streetcar in Philadelphia, Pennsylvania
Shanghai Metro Line 10, a subway line in Shanghai

10